Domachowo may refer to the following places:
Domachowo, Greater Poland Voivodeship (west-central Poland)
Domachowo, Pomeranian Voivodeship (north Poland)
Domachowo, West Pomeranian Voivodeship (north-west Poland)